Donald Daniel Audette (born September 23, 1969) is a Canadian former professional ice hockey forward who played fourteen seasons in the National Hockey League (NHL) for the Buffalo Sabres, Los Angeles Kings, Atlanta Thrashers, Dallas Stars, Montreal Canadiens and Florida Panthers.

Playing career
He was drafted in the 9th round of the 1989 NHL Entry Draft, 183rd overall by the Buffalo Sabres. Despite his small stature, Audette became known for his gritty, feisty style of play and quickly endeared himself to Buffalo hockey fans with a 31-goal rookie season. However, his rough and tumble style of play led to lengthy trips to the injury reserve, including several knee injuries that ended his 1992–93 and 1995–96 seasons.

In 1998 Audette was traded to the Los Angeles Kings. Two years later, as a member of the Atlanta Thrashers, he reached his career high in goals (34) and assists (45) and made it to the NHL All-Star game.

Audette was traded back to the Buffalo Sabres in March 2001, and signed a multimillion-dollar contract with the Dallas Stars later that summer. In the middle of the 2001–02 season, Audette was traded again, this time to the Montreal Canadiens. In a game against the New York Rangers on December 1, 2001, Audette had the tendons of his forearm severed by an opponent's skate and required life-saving surgery to repair the extensive damage, but still managed to recover in time for the playoffs.

After struggling to make a mark with the Florida Panthers for half of the 2003–04 season, Audette stopped playing professionally.

Prior to playing in the NHL, Audette won the Dudley "Red" Garrett Memorial Award as the top rookie in the American Hockey League (AHL), while playing for the Rochester Americans. Audette is now an amateur scout for the Canadiens.

Personal life
Donald Audette's son Daniel Audette (born in 1996) was the first pick of the 2012 Quebec Major Junior Hockey League draft and was drafted by the Montreal Canadiens in the 2014 NHL Entry Draft. Currently Audette is an amateur scout with the Montreal Canadiens.

Career statistics

Awards and honours

References

External links

1969 births
Atlanta Thrashers players
Buffalo Sabres captains
Buffalo Sabres draft picks
Buffalo Sabres players
Canadian ice hockey right wingers
Dallas Stars players
Florida Panthers players
French Quebecers
Hamilton Bulldogs (AHL) players
Ice hockey people from Quebec
Laval Titan players
Living people
Los Angeles Kings players
Montreal Canadiens players
Montreal Canadiens scouts
National Hockey League All-Stars
Rochester Americans players
Sportspeople from Laval, Quebec